

606001–606100 

|-bgcolor=#f2f2f2
| colspan=4 align=center | 
|}

606101–606200 

|-bgcolor=#f2f2f2
| colspan=4 align=center | 
|}

606201–606300 

|-bgcolor=#f2f2f2
| colspan=4 align=center | 
|}

606301–606400 

|-id=339
| 606339 Kierpiec ||  || Grzegorz Kierpiec (born 1980), a Polish school teacher and Catholic priest, known for his long-distance cycling expeditions. || 
|}

606401–606500 

|-bgcolor=#f2f2f2
| colspan=4 align=center | 
|}

606501–606600 

|-bgcolor=#f2f2f2
| colspan=4 align=center | 
|}

606601–606700 

|-bgcolor=#f2f2f2
| colspan=4 align=center | 
|}

606701–606800 

|-
| 606701 Golda ||  || Zdzisław A. Golda (born 1953), a Polish astrophysicist and cosmologist at Jagiellonian University in Kraków. || 
|}

606801–606900 

|-bgcolor=#f2f2f2
| colspan=4 align=center | 
|}

606901–607000 

|-bgcolor=#f2f2f2
| colspan=4 align=center | 
|}

References 

606001-607000